Paopi 30 - Coptic Calendar - Hathor 2

The first day of the Coptic month of Hathor, the third month of the Coptic year. On a common year, this day corresponds to October 28, of the Julian Calendar, and November 10, of the Gregorian Calendar. This day falls in the Coptic season of Peret, the season of emergence.

Commemorations

Saints 

 The martyrdom of Saint Cleopas the Apostle, one of the two Disciples of Emmaus 
 The martyrdom of Saint Cyriacus the Bishop of Jerusalem, and his Mother 
 The martyrdom of Saint Maximus, Saint Numitius, Saint Victor, and Saint Phillip 
 The martyrdom of Saint Anastasia the Elder, and Saint Cyril

References 

Days of the Coptic calendar